is a Japanese rock band, formed in September 2001 as the comedic side project of the visual kei band Nightmare. It consists of entirely the same members using aliases (although neither band admits this), with the addition of a programmer. Sendai Kamotsu consists of Chiba (lead vocals), Satty (guitar), Fullface (guitar), Wen Chen Chen (bass), Gigaflare (drums) and Kurihara (programming).

History

2001–2010
Sendai Kamotsu formed in 2001 before Nightmare became successful, beginning their activities in 2002. They took part in the first Cannonball omnibus and toured with Doremidan and Shulla. They were first featured in Nightmare's "Jishou -Shounen Terrorist-" PV, minus Chiba.

Their first two demo tapes, "Kimuchi" and "Saipan" were released in April and July 2002, respectively. Their first album, Okuru Kotoba came out in April 2004. After that was a yearly single and an album release, starting with "N.M.N-No More Nayamimuyo-" in February 2006, "Kamisama Mou Sukoshi Dake" and their popular album, Jinsei Game in July 2006, "Gei School Otokogumi" in October 2007 and "Umanamide" in October 2008. "Umanamide" was used as the theme song to the anime Zettai Yareru Girisha Shinwa, which also featured Chiba as a voice actor.

During a surprise concert on September 5, 2009, Sendai Kamotsu announced that the band would be going on a break due to the company going bankrupt in the economic recession. The story of their bankruptcy was played out in the music video for "Fukyou no Kaze". They released their third album, Deko on October 28, 2009. It reached #15 in the Oricon Charts. The band had their final shows at the end of October in Sendai and at the Nippon Budokan on November 5, 2009, titled "Fukyou no Kaze~Sendai Kamotsu ~Forever~."

During the band's hiatus, vocalist Chiba began a solo career under the name . Kurihara joined him again as sound manipulator. His first solo single,  was released on October 6, 2010. He embarked on a short solo tour in three live houses: Nagoya Diamond Hall, Osaka Big Cat, and Shibuya O-East. The short tour was called . Sendai Kamotsu's last Budokan live DVD and CD was released October 6, 2010 alongside "Gira Gira Boys."

Revival (2011–present)
The revival of Sendai Kamotsu was announced on their homepage in May 2011. Chiba stated the reason for their revival was because Japan was in crisis and needed a hero. The sextet returned with their four date tour  tour in July, as well as releasing two new songs via Dwango for download; "Hero ~Return of the Red Justice~" and "Okuru Kotoba 2." They begin another tour on December 23, 2012 titled .

Since the revival, Chiba has been going under his solo name Igaguri Chiba and has released a mini album titled . He was also a special musical guest at FanimeCon on May 26, 2012. This was his U.S. debut performance. Upon returning from the U.S., Chiba had embarked on a short tour titled "Bitch Boys ~Forever Your Love~." Sendai Kamotsu participated in Kishidan Banpaku 2012, a rock n' roll Olympic hosted by the band Kishidan. 

In April 2013, Sendai Kamorsu left their previous record label, Universal J, and joined Avex Entertainment after Chiba begged his big brother Yomi for a contact. Even though they are officially under Avex, their official label is called "G-nation!". Two best of albums, Suke Best 1 & 2, were released on July 10. The album  was then released on December 18. On July 30, 2014, the band released the album Sendie Kamotsu and embarked on a nationwide tour that ended at the end of August with two shows at Shibuya Public Hall.

Image
Sendai Kamotsu style themselves as a delivery company, with a uniform of red boilersuits. The members of the band call themselves "Employees". They even cited "company bankruptcy" as the reason for their hiatus in 2009. The band's rallying cry is that they love "Gay People" and fans have been known to shout "one more gay" to begin encores at live performances. Chiba is the younger brother of Nightmare's vocalist, Yomi.

Members
The members of Sendai Kamotsu and their Nightmare counterparts are:  
 Vocals:  - YOMI from Nightmare
 Guitar:  - Hitsugi from Nightmare
 Guitar:  - Sakito from Nightmare
 Bass:  - Ni~ya from Nightmare
 Drums:  - Ruka from Nightmare
 Programming: Kurihara

Discography

Studio albums

Singles

Compilation albums
 - Released: 2013.07.10 (Oricon: #17)
 - Released: 2013.07.10 (Oricon: #18)

Live albums
  - Released: 2010.10.06 (Oricon: #152)

Demo tapes
  - Released: 2002.04.27
  - Released: 2005.07.21

Video albums

See also
 Nightmare

References

External links

Official MySpace

Visual kei musical groups
Japanese rock music groups
Comedy rock musical groups
Musical groups established in 2001
Musical groups from Miyagi Prefecture
Japanese comedy musical groups
Bands with fictional stage personas